Noori Waterfall is a waterfall located in Tial village, Haripur District of Khyber Pakhtunkhwa province of Pakistan. The waterfall is approximately 10 feet in height. The waterfall is located in an open cove like formation on the side of a hill. The waterfall is small in height and has a clear blue water stream. The cove is filled with waist deep water with a sandy floor which is deeper on the edges.

Places to visit  Near Noori Waterfall 
Never Miss these spot when you are travelling to Noori waterfall. the view of eye catching spot make your tour memorable.

Here are the list of spots to visit.

 Seven Sister Waterfall 
 Black Waterfall
 Jabri Forest Rest House
 Sangam Waterfall

Incidents
 In 2020, an 18 year old boy died, when he after diving, got stuck under deeper part of the waterfall.

See also 
List of waterfalls of Pakistan

References

Waterfalls of Pakistan
Tourist attractions in Khyber Pakhtunkhwa
Haripur District